Marilyn Mantei Tremaine is an American computer scientist. She is an expert in human–computer interaction and considered a pioneer of the field.

Education 
Tremaine received a BS in mathematics, physics and French from the University of Wisconsin, and later in 1982 obtained a PhD in communication theory at the University of Southern California - with the last two years of her PhD spent at Carnegie Mellon University under the direction of Professor Allen Newell.

Awards 
Marilyn Tremaine received the ACM SIGCHI Lifetime Service Award in 2005, the Canadian Human Computer Communications Society 2010 Achievement Award, the Usability Professionals Association 2010 Lifetime Achievement Award. In 2022, Tremaine was elected into the ACM CHI Academy.

Professional career 
Tremaine's academic career started as a lecturer and later assistant professor in the University of Michigan Business School, then in 1988 she became associate professor in the Computer Science Department of the University of Toronto, Canada, and a part of the Dynamic Graphics Project. In 1997, she returned to the US. She joined Drexel University as Professor of Computer and Information Systems. In 2001, she joined the New Jersey Institute of Technology where she was a professor and chair of the Information Systems Department. In 2008, she was a Research Professor at Rutgers University with joint appointments in the College of Communication and Information and the Department of Electrical and Computer Engineering. She is currently teaching as an adjunct professor at the University of Toronto.

Tremaine is a Distinguished Alumni of the University of Toronto Knowledge Media Design Institute. Tremaine has also been vice president of product development for three software startup companies and a Senior Research Scientist at the EDS Center for Applied Research.

Tremaine co-founded ACM SIGCHI. She was the president of SIGCHI from 1999 to 2002, and served as SIGCHI's vice-president of communications, finance, and conference planning. Tremaine served on six editorial boards for journals and received two university teaching awards.

Tremaine is known for psychology studies of early interactive user interfaces, collaborative software, and for developing a framework for cost-justifying usability engineering. Other research interests include auditory and multimodal interface design, global software development, and the development of interfaces for the blind and visually impaired, people with Aphasia, or in rehabilitation following a stroke.

Tremaine has developed educational programs in HCI and related fields, such as the Master of Business and Science on User Experience Design at Rudgers University. In addition, she helped develop SIGCHI's Human-Computer Interaction curriculum resources.

Personal life 
Marilyn Tremaine resides in Toronto, Canada, and is married to the astrophysicist Scott Tremaine.
Marilyn Tremaine enjoys cooking and catering formal dinners.

Bibliography 

 
 
 
 Mantei, M. and Gey, F. Keyword Access to a Mass Storage Device at the Record Level.  Proceedings of the International Conference on Very Large Data Bases, Boston, MA, 1975.

References

External links 
 Marilyn Tremaine Rudgers home page (now inactive) and its Wayback Machine archive captured Sept 9, 2018
 Research Professor Marilyn Tremaine webpage at Rutgers's Center for Advanced Information Processing (now inactive) and its Wayback Machine archive captured July 26,2011
 
 
 Interview of Marilyn Tremaine as participant of the HCI and Aging: Beyond Accessibility" May 2019 Workshop - Retrieved Jan 17, 2022
  Technical video "The Strauss Mouse" by Marilyn Mantei, part of the ACM CHI'90 Technical Video Program, Issue 56 of the SIGGRAPH Video Review (1990) - retrieved Jan 17, 2002

Living people
University of Wisconsin–Madison College of Letters and Science alumni
University of Southern California alumni
University of Michigan faculty
Academic staff of the University of Toronto
Rutgers University faculty
American computer scientists
Human–computer interaction researchers
American women computer scientists
American women academics
21st-century American women
Year of birth missing (living people)